Neoechinodiscus is a genus of two species of lichenicolous fungi with uncertain familial placement in the order Helotiales.

Species:

Neoechinodiscus kozhevnikovii 
Neoechinodiscus lesdainii 

These species used to be classified in Echinodiscus, a genus proposed by Javier Etayo and Paul Diederich in 2000. Diederich subsequently discovered that the fungal use of the genus name was an illegitimate homonym, as it had already been used for a legume genus in 1837, as well as for a diatom genus in 1925. The replacement name Neoechinodiscus was proposed by Rubén Sierra and Eduardo Molinari-Novoa in 2020.

References

Helotiales
Helotiales genera
Lichenicolous fungi
Taxa described in 2020